Agesilaus was a Greek historian who wrote a work on the early history of Italy, fragments of which are preserved in Plutarch's "Parallel Lives", and in Stobaeus' Florilegium.

References

Ancient Greek historians known only from secondary sources
Ancient Italian history